Irvine East is one of the nine wards used to elect members of the North Ayrshire council. It was originally created in 2007 and returned four councillors, covering eastern parts of Irvine, i.e everything east of the A78 road, apart from the south-eastern industrial area around Drybridge and Shewalton. A national boundary review prior to the 2017 local elections led to a new ward, Irvine South being created, the East ward losing the Broomlands and Dreghorn areas, and one seat. A further re-organisation for the 2022 election in relation to the Islands (Scotland) Act 2018 did not affect the Irvine wards. In 2020, the population was 12,542.

Councillors

Election Results

2022 Election
2022 North Ayrshire Council election

Source:

2017 Election
2017 North Ayrshire Council election

2012 Election
2012 North Ayrshire Council election

2007 Election
2007 North Ayrshire Council election

References

Wards of North Ayrshire
Irvine, North Ayrshire